Semidesny is a rural locality (a khutor) in Besedinsky Selsoviet Rural Settlement, Kursky District, Kursk Oblast, Russia. Population: .

Geography 
The khutor is located 114 km from the Russia–Ukraine border, 18 km east of the district center – the town Kursk, 10 km from the selsoviet center – Besedino.

 Climate
Semidesny has a warm-summer humid continental climate (Dfb in the Köppen climate classification).

Transport 
Semidesny is located 10.5 km from the federal route  (Kursk – Voronezh –  "Kaspy" Highway; a part of the European route ), 0.2 km from the road of regional importance  (Kursk – Kastornoye), on the road of intermunicipal significance  (38K-016 – Semidesny), 2.5 km from the nearest railway station Otreshkovo (railway line Kursk – 146 km).

The rural locality is situated 18 km from Kursk Vostochny Airport, 127 km from Belgorod International Airport and 186 km from Voronezh Peter the Great Airport.

References

Notes

Sources

Rural localities in Kursky District, Kursk Oblast